Agonoscelis pubescens, the African cluster bug or sorghum bug, is a species of stink bug in the family Pentatomidae. In Africa, it is a pest of crops such as sorghum and sesame.

Synonyms
Agonoscelis versicolor Fabricius, 1794

References

Pentatomidae
Agricultural pest insects
Insect pests of millets